The Register of Copyrights is the director of the United States Copyright Office within the Library of Congress, as provided by .  The Office has been headed by a Register since 1897. The Register is appointed by, and responsible to, the Librarian of Congress.

Although the title suggests a clerical role, Registers of Copyrights have been responsible for creating the procedures and practices of the Copyright Office and establishing standards for registration of copyright.  They have increasingly been responsible for setting or influencing United States copyright policy.  Today the Register is responsible for administering rulemaking procedures and producing authoritative interpretations of some aspects of U.S. copyright law, as well as advising the Librarian of Congress on the triennial proceeding on exceptions to the anticircumvention rules of the Digital Millennium Copyright Act.  The Register also routinely testifies before Congress on copyright policy matters.

 the position is  held by Shira Perlmutter, who took office October 25, 2020.

On April 26, 2017, the House of Representatives voted in favor of a bill that, if approved by the Senate, will make Register of Copyrights a position that is filled by presidential appointment with Senate confirmation, rather than appointed by the Librarian of Congress—a policy that has been in place since the establishment of the Copyright Office, and impose a maximum term of 10 years. The bill has been supported by the entertainment industry and other groups (including the MPAA and RIAA), as the new selection procedure would give them the opportunity to lobby for a Register of Copyrights that aligns with their interests in stronger copyright protection. These effects have been the basis of opposition towards the bill by politicians, and groups such as the Electronic Frontier Foundation and Public Knowledge, which feel that the bill would give corporate stakeholders a higher level of influence over U.S. copyright policies, rather than balancing the laws to meet the needs of the public.

List of Registers of Copyrights

References

Sources

 
 
 United States Code. .

1897 establishments in Washington, D.C.